Zéphyrin Toé (30 December 1928 − 25 November 2013) was a Burkinabé Roman Catholic bishop.

Ordained to the priesthood on 6 April 1958, Toé was named bishop of the Roman Catholic Diocese of Nouna, Burkina Faso on 5 July 1973, and was later named bishop of the Roman Catholic Diocese of Dédougou, Burkina Faso on 14 April 2000 and retired on 14 June 2005.

References

1928 births
2013 deaths
People from Boucle du Mouhoun Region
21st-century Roman Catholic bishops in Burkina Faso
20th-century Roman Catholic bishops in Burkina Faso
Roman Catholic bishops of Nouna
Roman Catholic bishops of Dédougou